Events in the year 2018 in Iceland.

Incumbents
 President: Guðni Th. Jóhannesson
 Prime Minister: Katrín Jakobsdóttir

Events

26 May – scheduled date for the Icelandic municipal elections, 2018

Sports
9 to 25 February – Iceland participated at the 2018 Winter Olympics in PyeongChang, South Korea, with 5 competitors in 2 sports

9 to 18 March – Iceland participated at the 2018 Winter Paralympics in PyeongChang, South Korea

Music

Deaths

9 February – Jóhann Jóhannsson, composer (b. 1969)

28 February – Stefán Kristjánsson, chess player (b. 1982).

12 March – Sverrir Hermannsson, politician, businessman and banker (b. 1930)

16 March – Guðjón Arnar Kristjánsson, politician, MP (b. 1944).

24 May – Oddur Pétursson, cross country skier (b. 1931).

29 June – Jónas Kristjánsson, writer and newspaper editor (b. 1940).

21 August – Stefán Karl Stefánsson, actor and singer (b. 1975).

References

 
2010s in Iceland
Years of the 21st century in Iceland
Iceland
Iceland